Adampur is a city and municipal council in Jalandhar district in the Indian state of Punjab.

Adampur may also refer to:
 Adampur, Punjab Assembly constituency
 Adampur Airport, a proposed domestic airport (ICAO: VIAX) to be built at Adampur near Jalandhar
 Adampur, Haryana, a village in Hisar district, Haryana 
 Adampur, Haryana Assembly constituency
 Adampur, Pratapgarh, Uttar Pradesh, a village of Pratapgarh district, Uttar Pradesh
 Adampur, Varanasi, a village in Varanasi tehsil of Varanasi district, Uttar Pradesh

See also
 Adampur Mouchri, a village near the town of Khatauli in Muzaffarnagar district, Uttar Pradesh, India
 Chhawani Adampur, a village in the Bhopal district of Madhya Pradesh, India